Revelations is the third studio album by American country music artist Wynonona, released in 1996 on MCA Records in association with Curb Records. It was her first album since Tell Me Why three years previous. The album's lead-off single, "To Be Loved by You", was her fourth and most recent to date #1 on the Billboard Hot Country Songs charts. The second single, "Heaven Help My Heart", peaked at #14 on the same chart, while "My Angel Is Here" and "Somebody to Love You" both missed the top 40, becoming the first two singles of her career to do so. The album itself peaked at #2 on the Top Country Albums charts and #9 on The Billboard 200, and was certified platinum by the RIAA.

The track "Free Bird" is a cover of the Lynyrd Skynyrd song, and was previously included on the 1994 tribute album Skynyrd Frynds.

Track listing

Charts and certification

Personnel 
 Wynonna Judd – lead vocals
 Steve Nathan – synthesizers (1, 9), Hammond B3 organ (2, 5, 6), synth strings (3, 4, 6), acoustic piano (4, 8, 9)
 Matt Rollings – electric piano (1, 4), acoustic piano (2, 6, 7), Wurlitzer electric piano (5), Hammond B3 organ (8, 10)
 Don Potter – acoustic guitar (1-6, 8, 9), electric guitar (10)
 Steuart Smith – electric guitar (1, 2, 5-8, 10), acoustic guitar (3), slide acoustic guitar (4)
 Dann Huff – electric guitar (2, 3, 5, 8, 9), gut-string electric guitar (7)
 Paul Franklin – steel guitar (4)
 Willie Weeks – bass (1-6, 8-10)
 Eddie Bayers – drums (1-6, 8-10)
 Tom Roady – percussion (4, 5, 6)
 Terry McMillan – harmonica (5)
 Jim Horn – baritone saxophone (5), saxophones (10)
 Roger "Rock" Williams – tenor saxophone (5)
 Jim Hoke – saxophones (10)
 Barry Green – trombone (10)
 "Hollywood" Paul Litteral – trumpet (5)
 Mike Haynes – trumpet (10)
 Steve Dorff – string arrangements (3, 7)
 The Nashville String Machine – strings (3, 7)
 Bob Bailey – backing vocals (1, 4, 5, 8, 9, 10)
 Kim Fleming – backing vocals (1, 4, 5, 8, 9, 10)
 Vicki Hampton – backing vocals (1, 4, 5, 9, 10)
 Jonell Mosser – backing vocals (2)
 Gordon Kennedy – backing vocals (3)
 Max Carl – backing vocals (4)
 Andrew Gold – backing vocals (6)
 Suzy Wills – backing vocals (8)
 Willie Greene, Jr. – backing vocals (10)
 The Born Again Minstrels Church Choir – additional backing vocals (10)

Production 
 Tony Brown – producer 
 Don Potter – associate producer
 Chuck Ainlay – recording (1-8), mixing (9, 10), mastering 
 Jeff Balding – recording (9, 10)
 Terry Christian – overdub recording  (3, 7), string overdubbing (7)
 Justin Niebank – overdub recording (7, 8)
 Graham Lewis – mixing (1-8), second engineer 
 Robert Charles – second engineer  (2, 3, 7)
 Joe Hayden – second engineer (3, 7)
 King Williams – second engineer (3, 7)
 Craig White – second engineer (8)
 Chris Davie – second engineer (9, 10)
 Denny Purcell – mastering 
 Jessie Noble – project coordinator 
 John Coulter – art direction, design
 Randee St. Nicholas – photography 
 Nancy Ogami – calligraphy
 Eric Barnard – stylist, make-up 
 Roni Burks – stylist 
 John Unger – management 

Studios
 Recorded at Javelina Recording Studios and Sound Stage Studios (Nashville, TN).
 Overdubbed at The Bennett House (Franklin, TN); Javelina Recording Studios and The Tracking Room (Nashville, TN).
 Mixed at Emerald Sound Studios and The Tracking Room.
 Mastered at Georgetown Masters (Nashville, TN).

References
Allmusic (see infobox)

1996 albums
Curb Records albums
MCA Records albums
Wynonna Judd albums
Albums produced by Tony Brown (record producer)